The Leading Hotels of the World, Ltd. (LHW) is a marketing organization, representing more than 400 hotels in over 80 countries. Established in 1928 by European hoteliers, LHW is headquartered in New York City.

History 
The company was established in 1928 by a group of European hoteliers. With 38 initial members, among them Hotel Negresco in Nice, the Mena House in Cairo, the Montreux Palace in Montreux and King David Hotel in Jerusalem, the organization was initially known as "The Luxury Hotels of Europe and Egypt".

The founders opened an office in New York named Hotel Representative, Inc. (HRI). By the end of the 1960s, HRI had grown to represent 70 hotels – all of which were in Europe.

From 1971, it admitted new member properties worldwide. As of 2018, LHW represents "more than 400 hotels in over 80 countries".

Operations 
The properties include independent and unusual hotels throughout the world, including former castles, mountain hideaways, safari camps and private islands. Hotels seeking to join must have a referral from an existing member hotel and apply for admission.

List of affiliated hotels 
As of August 10, 2020:

Former affiliated hotels

An incomplete list of formerly affiliated hotels:

Cap Juluca – Anguilla
Emirates Wolgan Valley Resort & Spa – Wolgan Valley, Australia
Copacabana Palace – Rio de Janeiro, Brazil
Tabacon Grand Spa Thermal Resort – Nuevo Arenal, Costa Rica
Royal Palm Hotel – Santa Cruz, Ecuador
Hotel Oro Verde – Guayaquil, Ecuador
Mena House – Cairo, Egypt
La Residence des Cascades – Hurghada, Egypt
The Gainsborough Bath Spa – Bath, England
Hôtel du Palais – Biarritz, France
Hôtel La Résidence de la Pinède – Saint-Tropez, France
Hôtel Lancaster – Paris, France
Hotel Königshof – Munich, Germany
Mandola Rosa Suites & Villas – Peloponnese, Greece
Amphitryon Hotel – Nafplio, Greece
Taj Mahal Palace Hotel – Mumbai, India
Umaid Bhawan Palace  – Jodhpur, India
Rambagh Palace  – Jaipur, India
Lake Palace – Udaipur, India
Falaknuma Palace – Hyderabad, India
Taj Coromandel – Chennai, India
Belmond Villa San Michele – Florence, Italy
San Domenico Palace Hotel – Sicily, Italy
Bauer L'Hotel – Venice, Italy
Byblos Art Hotel Villa Amista – Verona, Italy
Hotel Palazzo Della Fonte – Fiuggi, Italy
Grand Hotel Timeo – Messina, Italy
Grand Hotel Villa Medici – Florence, Italy
Hotel Cipriani & Palazzo Vendramin – Venice, Italy
Belmond Hotel Splendido – Portofino, Italy
Hotel Caruso – Ravello, Italy
Cristallo Hotel Spa & Golf – Cortina d'Ampezzo, Italy
The Windsor Hotel Toya Resort & Spa – Tōyako, Japan
Le Royal Hotels & Resorts – Beirut – Beirut, Lebanon
Hotel Majestic – Kuala Lumpur, Malaysia
Grand Velas Riviera Nayarit – Nayarit, Mexico
Belmond Hotel Monasterio – Cusco, Peru
Miraflores Park Hotel – Miraflores, Peru
La Cigale Hotel – Doha, Qatar
Grand Hotel Europe – St. Petersburg, Russia
Nobu Hotel Riyadh – Riyadh, Saudi Arabia
Paradise Hotel Busan – Busan, South Korea
Alva Park Costa Brava – Spain
Fairmont Le Montreux Palace – Montreux, Switzerland
Santiburi Koh Samui – Thailand
The Residence Tunis – Tunis, Tunisia
Swissôtel The Bosphorus – Istanbul, Turkey
Atlantis, The Palm – Dubai, UAE
The H Hotel – Dubai, UAE
Taj Campton Place – San Francisco, California
Skylofts at MGM Grand – Las Vegas
Willard Hotel – Washington, D.C.
The Umstead Hotel and Spa – Cary, North Carolina
Canyon Ranch Miami Beach – Miami Beach, Florida
Shutters on the Beach – Santa Monica, California
Bernardus Lodge & Spa – Carmel Valley, California
Le Pavillon Hotel – New Orleans, Louisiana
Market Pavilion Hotel – Charleston, South Carolina
Whiteface Lodge – Lake Placid, New York
Williamsburg Inn – Williamsburg, Virginia
Mutiara Beach Resort – Penang, Malaysia

References

External links

 
Organizations established in 1928
Hotel affiliation groups
Organizations based in New York City
Luxury brands